Dominic Collins (1566 – 31 October 1602) was an Irish Jesuit lay brother, an ex-soldier, who died for his Catholic faith. He was beatified as a martyr by Pope John Paul II on 27 September 1992.

Life
Collins was born in 1566 of a prominent merchant family in Youghal, County Cork, in the Kingdom of Ireland, His father and brother both served as mayors of the town. In 1586 he went to Nantes, France, where he worked for three years as a servant in various hostelries in Brittany, to acquire a horse and to join the cavalry during the Brittany Campaign of the French Wars of Religion. In 1589 he joined the forces of the Catholic League led by Philippe Emmanuel, Duke of Mercœur, at war against the Breton Huguenots. He was soon promoted to the rank of Captain (under the name of La Branche), and was appointed military governor of territory taken from the Huguenots.

Collins went to Spain with a letter of recommendation for King Philip II, whose service he entered. He transferred to the Spanish Army and was stationed in the garrison at La Coruña. After nine years of military service, he decided to leave the army, and was granted a pension of 25 escudos a month by King Philip.

During the Lent of 1598, Collins met an Irish Jesuit priest, Thomas White from Clonmel, who had founded the Irish College at Salamanca. Collins expressed a desire to become a Jesuit and White introduced him to the superiors of the college. Although he was now 32 years old, the Jesuit provincial thought it was wise to delay his entrance, perhaps to test the strength of his vocation. There were doubts too about his being sufficiently educated to become a priest but he was willing to be a Jesuit lay brother. He entered the Jesuit novitiate in Santiago de Compostela in December 1598. When the Jesuit College was struck by a plague, Dominic tended the victims, nursing some of them back to health and comforting the others in their last hours. A report from that time describes him as a man of sound judgement and great physical strength; mature, prudent and sociable, though inclined to be hot-tempered and obstinate. He was allowed to profess religious vows in the Society in February 1601.

Soon after his profession, an expedition was organised by King Philip III of Spain to assist Hugh O'Neill and Red Hugh O'Donnell in their attempt at revolt against English rule. James Archer, an Irish Jesuit priest assigned by the king as chaplain to army requested that Collins be assigned as his companion and assistant, due to his extensive military background. The fleet set sail on 3 September 1601 in two squadrons. The smaller part of the fleet, to which Collins was assigned, ran into bad weather and was delayed, eventually reaching Castlehaven in southwestern Cork on 1 December, the main squadron having reached Kinsale more than two months earlier.

After the disastrous Battle of Kinsale (24 December 1601), Archer returned to Spain to seek help. Collins remained behind at Dunboy Castle to attend to the spiritual needs of 143 Irish soldiers who were besieged by 4,000 English troops. After an eleven-day siege, Dunboy fell into the hands of the English on 18 June 1602. While the others were immediately hanged, the Jesuit and two other survivors were held prisoner. They were then taken to Cork where they were tortured, and the two surviving Irish soldiers soon executed.

Relishing the prospect of having a Jesuit abjure his faith in his very hometown, the English took Collins from Shandon Castle in Cork to Youghal, a distance of 173 km. There, he addressed the crowd in Spanish, Irish and English, cheerfully telling them that he had come to Ireland to defend the Catholic faith, for which he was happy to die. So moved was the crowd that the hangman fled and a passing fisherman was forced to do carry out the execution. He was hanged on 31 October 1602, condemned to death Without any formal trial.

Beatification 
Collins was beatified – along with Francis Taylor and 13 other Irish martyrs – on 27 September 1992 by Pope John-Paul II.

Liturgically his feast is celebrated on 20 June, or 30 October (in the Society of Jesus). Today a Jesuit residence in Dublin is named after him.

References

Bibliography 
Finegan, F.: "The Beatified Martyrs of Ireland," in Irish Theological Quarterly, vol. 65, 2000, 157–167.
Forristal, D.: Dominic Collins: Irish martyr, Jesuit brother, Dublin, 1992.

1566 births
1602 deaths
People from Youghal
16th-century Irish Jesuits
Irish soldiers in the French Army
Irish soldiers in the Spanish Army
17th-century Irish Jesuits
17th-century Roman Catholic martyrs
People executed under Elizabeth I as Queen of Ireland
Executed Irish people
Jesuit martyrs
Beatifications by Pope John Paul II
Irish beatified people
Beatified Jesuits
Beatified Roman Catholic religious brothers
24 Irish Catholic Martyrs